Roualle is a mountain of Savoie, France. It lies in the Aravis Range and has an elevation of 2,589 metres above sea level.

Mountains of the Alps
Mountains of Savoie
Mountains of Haute-Savoie